Anthony Joseph Drexel Biddle Sr. (October 1, 1874 – May 27, 1948) was a millionaire whose fortune allowed him to pursue theatricals, self-published writing, athletics, and Christianity on a full-time basis.

He was the man upon whom the book My Philadelphia Father and the play and film The Happiest Millionaire were based. He trained men in hand-to-hand combat in both World War I and World War II, was a fellow of the American Geographical Society and founded a movement called "Athletic Christianity" that eventually attracted 300,000 members around the world. A 1955 Sports Illustrated article called him "boxing's greatest amateur" as well as a "major factor in the re-establishment of boxing as a legal and, at that time, estimable sport."

Early life 
He was born on October 1, 1874, in Philadelphia, Pennsylvania, to Edward Biddle II and Emily Drexel. He was a grandson of banker Anthony Joseph Drexel, and a great-grandson of banker Nicholas Biddle.  Biddle was a graduate of Germany's Heidelberg University.

Career
An officer in the United States Marine Corps, Biddle was an expert in close-quarters fighting and the author of Do or Die: A Supplementary Manual on Individual Combat, a book on combat methods, including knives and empty-hand skills, training both the United States Marine Corps in two world wars and special agents of the Federal Bureau of Investigation.  He can be seen training Marines in the RKO short documentary Soldiers of the Sea.  He was considered not just an expert in fighting, but also a pioneer of United States Marine Corps training in the bayonet and hand-to-hand combat.  He based his style on fencing, though this approach was sometimes criticized as being unrealistic for military combat.

Having joined the Marines in 1917 at the age of 41, he also convinced his superiors to include boxing in Marine Corps recruit training.  In 1919, he was promoted to the rank of major, and became a lieutenant colonel in 1934.  In Lansdowne, Pennsylvania, right outside of Philadelphia, Biddle opened a military training facility, where he trained 4,000 men. His training included long hours of calisthenics and gymnastics, and taught skills such as machete, saber, dagger, and bayonet combat, as well as hand grenade use, boxing, wrestling, savate and jiujitsu. He also served two years in the National Guard.

A keen boxer, Biddle sparred with Jack Johnson and taught boxing to Gene Tunney. He even hosted "boxing teas" in his home, where other boxers would spar a couple of rounds with him and then join the family for dinner. A February 1909 match with Philadelphia Jack O'Brien was attended by society leaders including women in elegant evening gowns.

He served as a judge in the fight between Jack Dempsey and Jess Willard on 4 July 1919.
 
On February 5, 1920, Biddle, as chairman of the Army Navy and Civilian Board of Boxing Control of New York, became a member the International Boxing Union.

During World War II, Biddle returned to active duty with the Marine Corps with the rank of colonel and taught hand-to-hand combat to recruits.

Writings
Biddle also worked in and on periodicals. He spent time as a sports reporter for the Public Ledger, and jokingly referred to himself as "the poorest and richest reporter in Philadelphia". He also revived the Philadelphia Sunday Graphic for a short interval, before it was forced to fold, and founded a short-lived "society weekly"–type publication, The People. After organizing the also short-lived Drexel Biddle Publishing House, he acted as its head for two years.

Books written by Biddle include:

 A dual rôle: and other stories. The Warwick Book Publishing Company. 1894.
 The Madeira Islands. Philadelphia: Drexel, Biddle & Bradley Publishing Company. 1896.
 Shantytown Sketches. Philadelphia: Drexel, Biddle & Bradley Publishing Company. 1897.
 The Froggy Fairy Book (1896) and The Second Froggy Fairy Book (1900) Drexel, Biddle & Bradley publishing company
 The Flowers of Life. Philadelphia: Drexel, Biddle & Bradley Publishing Company. 1897.
 Word for Word and Letter for Letter; a biographical romance. Gay & Bird. 1898.
 Do or Die: A Supplementary Manual on Individual Combat. U.S. Marine Corps. 1937. (reprinted 1944 with new material, reprinted 1975)

Personal life
In 1895, he married Cordelia Rundell Bradley. Together, they had:

 Anthony Joseph Drexel Biddle Jr. (1897–1961), who married Mary Duke (1887–1960). They were the parents of Mary Duke Biddle (1920–2012) and Nicholas Benjamin Duke Biddle
 Cordelia Drexel Biddle (1898–1984), who married firstly Angier Buchanan Duke (1884–1923), the son of Benjamin Newton Duke. They were the parents of Angier Biddle Duke (1915–1995) and Anthony Drexel Duke (1918–2014). Her second marriage was to  then architect Thomas Markoe Robertson in 1924.
 Livingston Ludlow Biddle (1899–1981), who married Kate Raboteau Page (b. 1903), daughter of Robert N. Page. They were the parents of Livingston Ludlow Biddle III. Kate obtained a divorce in Reno in 1937, citing cruelty. Biddle married Suzanne Hutchinson Burke (1909-2000) whose mother was Mary Forbes Fay, the daughter of Alfred Forbes Fay (1843-1881). Suzanne donated two paintings by Jane Stuart of her mother and great uncle Sigourney Webster Fay (1836-1908) to the Boston Athenaeum in 1983. Monsignor Cyril Sigourney Webster Fay (1875-1919) was her uncle.

He died May 27, 1948, from a cerebral hemorrhage and uremic poisoning and is interred at the Woodlands Cemetery in Philadelphia.

Legacy
His daughter, Cordelia Drexel Biddle, worked with Kyle Crichton (father of Robert Crichton) to write a novel based on her family in 1955. In 1956, it was made into a play starring Walter Pidgeon. In 1967 a musical film based on the story, The Happiest Millionaire, was the last musical film to have personal involvement from Walt Disney. Biddle was played by Fred MacMurray in the film.

References

Further reading
 The Washington Post; August 17, 1933 "Helen Avis Howard Engaged To Anthony J. Drexel Jr.  Dr. and Mrs. Clinton Howard, of Atlanta, have announced the engagement of their daughter. Miss Helen Avis Howard, to Mr. Anthony Joseph Drexel 3d, son of Mr. and Mrs. Anthony Joseph Drexel Jr. of Philadelphia."
 Time; June 4, 1948 "Died. Colonel Anthony Joseph Drexel Biddle Sr., 73, muscular Christian, father of the wartime ambassador to the governments in exile; following a cerebral hemorrhage; in Syosset, N.Y. He founded the Drexel Biddle Bible Classes in 1907 (their curriculum of fighting-&-praying ultimately attracted 200,000 members), taught jujitsu and dirty fighting to Marines in both World War."
 The New York Times; October 14, 2004 "Nicholas Duke Biddle, 83, Scion of Wealth Who Helped the Poor. Nicholas Duke Biddle, scion of two prominent American families who helped refugees from Cuba and Caribbean, dies at age 83.  Mr. Biddle was originally named Anthony Joseph Drexel Biddle III, after his father, Anthony Joseph Drexel Biddle Jr., a prominent diplomat."

External links

 

1874 births
1948 deaths
American philanthropists
Anthony Joseph Drexel Sr.
Burials at The Woodlands Cemetery
Drexel family
Members of the Philadelphia Club
Military personnel from Philadelphia
United States Marine Corps officers
Heidelberg University alumni
American people of English descent
American people of Austrian descent
United States Marine Corps personnel of World War I
People associated with physical culture
American expatriates in Germany
American boxing trainers
American boxing referees